War Heroes is a compilation album by American guitarist Jimi Hendrix.  Released in the UK on October 1, 1972, and in December 1972 in the US, it was the third album of mostly unreleased studio recordings to be issued after Hendrix's death. The album was engineered, mixed and compiled by Eddie Kramer and John Jansen, although biographer and later Hendrix producer John McDermott also identifies Hendrix as a producer.

War Heroes contains three songs that Hendrix proposed for his fourth studio album: "Stepping Stone", "Izabella", and "Beginnings" (listed as "Beginning"). These and songs from the two 1971 albums, The Cry of Love and Rainbow Bridge,  were included on First Rays of the New Rising Sun (1997).  War Heroes reached number 23 in the UK Albums Chart, number 48 on the US Billboard 200, and number 51 in Canada.

Track listing
All tracks written by Jimi Hendrix, except where noted.

Personnel
Jimi Hendrixguitars, vocals
Mitch Mitchelldrums
Billy Coxbass guitar on "Bleeding Heart", "Peter Gunn Catastrophe", "Stepping Stone" and "Izabella"
Noel Reddingbass guitar on "Highway Chile", "Tax Free" and "Midnight"

Recording details
 "Bleeding Heart" recorded at Record Plant in New York City, on March 24, 1970
 "Highway Chile" recorded at Olympic Studios in London, on April 3, 1967
 "Tax Free" recorded at Record Plant, on May 1, 1968
 "Peter Gunn Catastrophe" recorded at Record Plant, on May 14, 1970
 "Stepping Stone" recorded at Record Plant, on November 14, 1969 and on June 26, 1970 (overdubs)
 "Midnight" recorded at Olmstead Studios, on April 3, 1969
  "3 Little Bears" recorded at Record Plant, on May 2, 1968 
 "Beginning" recorded at Electric Lady Studios in New York City, on June 16 and/or July 1, 1970
 "Izabella" recorded at The Hit Factory in New York City, on August 28 and 29, 1969

References

1972 compilation albums
Jimi Hendrix albums
Compilation albums published posthumously
Albums produced by Eddie Kramer
Albums recorded at Electric Lady Studios